Calibre 50 is a Regional Mexican band founded in the city of Mazatlán, Sinaloa in 2010. Their style is Norteño-Banda, a hybrid of Norteño, which uses an electric bass or tololoche for the low notes and replaces it with a sousaphone (tuba), which is typically used in Banda for the bass notes.

History
Before establishing Calibre 50, Edén Muñoz had been the accordionist and vocalist in the Norteño-banda group, Colmillo Norteño. With Muñoz, the group scored the hit songs "Sueño guajiro" and "Hotel El Cid" in 2009, among others. Nevertheless, conflicts with the other members of the band led Muñoz to quit Colmillo Norteño in early 2010, and he founded his own band later that year, recruiting Armando Ramos as guitarist and backing vocalist, Martín López as sousaphonist, and Augusto Guido as drummer. The name of this new band was "Puro Colmillo Norteño", and they recorded their first album, "Renovar o Morir", under that name, as well as their first single ("El infiernito"). However, the original Colmillo Norteño sued them over the name, and after a legal dispute Muñoz' band was forced to change their name later in 2010. They chose the name by which they are known today: Calibre 50. The name of the band comes from the comparison "with an element that will symbolize the strength and impact that the project has on the lives of the members, as well as those who like the Regional Mexican genre."

Calibre 50 first achieved notoriety for their controversial songs, among them corridos. Their first nationwide hit was "El tierno se fue" ("The nice guy is gone") in 2011, a ranchera written by Lalo Ayala which contains many innuendos and describes a sexual act in detail. Throughout its history, the band has recorded different styles of songs such as rancheras, corridos, ballads, cumbias, charangas, boleros, and huapangos.

In January 2014, drummer Augusto Guido left the band to work on his own group, "Los de Sinaloa"; he was replaced by Erick García. Two months later, sousaphone player Martín López also left the band to work on another project, "La Iniciativa". He was subsequently replaced by Alejandro Gaxiola.

In March 2017, Calibre 50 made history when the band became the first Regional Mexican act to perform on the Conan show on an episode that took place in Mexico City.

Calibre 50 made their Rodeo Houston debut on 11 March 2018 to a sold out crowd.

On 26 April 2018, Calibre 50, along with Colombian Urban singer J Balvin, received an award from Pandora Radio for being the first artists to surpass a billion streams on that platform.

In October 2020, the group broke the record for the most number-one songs on the Billboard Regional Mexican Airplay chart with 17 songs. As of 2022, they have since broken their own record with five additional songs reaching No. 1, totaling 22 No. 1 songs on the Billboard Regional Mexican Airplay chart. 

In late January 2022, Edén Muñoz left Calibre 50 to embark on a solo career.

On 1 March 2022, after several auditions, the band presented in a press conference their new lead vocalist, Tony Elizondo.

On 8 April 2022, Calibre 50 presented in another press conference their new accordion player and additional backing vocalist, Ángel Saucedo.

Members
Tony Elizondo, lead vocals
Armando Ramos, backing vocals and twelve-string guitar
Angel Saucedo, backing vocals and diatonic accordion
Alejandro Gaxiola, sousaphone
Erick García, drums

Past members
Augusto Guído, drums
Edén Muñoz, lead vocals and diatonic accordion
Martín López, sousaphone, diatonic accordion

Discography
Albums

2010: Renovar O Morir (Originally issued under the name "Puro Colmillo Norteño", later reissued as Calibre 50).
2011: De Sinaloa Para El Mundo
2012: El Buen Ejemplo
2013: La Recompensa
2013: Corridos De Alto Calibre
2013: 21 Black Jack (New Edition Remastered)
2014: Contigo
2015: Historias de La Calle
2016: Desde El Rancho
2017: En Vivo Desde El Auditorio Telmex
2017: Guerra De Poder
2018: Mitad Y Mitad
2019: Lo Más Eschuchando De Calibre 50
2019: Simplemente Gracias
2020: En Vivo
2020: Desde Estudio Andaluz Music
2021: Las Numero 1 De Calibre 50
2021: Vamos Bien
2021: Las 20 Numero 1 De Calibre 50 En Billboard
2022: Corridos De Alto Calibre, Vol. II

Singles

2011: Mujer De Todos, Mujer De Nadie
2014: Una Mala Elección
2014: Siempre Contigo
2015: Aunque Ahora Estés Con Él
2015: La Gripa
2015: Contigo (Version Pop)
2016: Amor Del Bueno
2016: La Bola
2016: Siempre Te Voy A Querer
2016: Pa' Qué Me Hacen Enojar
2017: Las Ultras
2017: Contigo (En Vivo Auditorio Telmex)
2017: Javier El De Los Llanos (En Vivo Auditorio Telmex)
2017: Ni Que Estuvieras Tan Buena (En Vivo Auditorio Telmex)
2017: Corrido De Juanito
2017: Frijoles Con Panela
2017: Se Los Lleva Por Delante
2018: Mitad Y Mitad
2018: Tu Patrocinador
2018: Una Mala Racha
2018: Mi Sorpresa Fuiste Tú
2018: A Mover Los Pies
2018: A Las Cuántas Decepciones
2019: Simplemente Gracias
2019: Más Ganas Le Meto
2019: Chalito
2019: Solo Tú
2019: Chalito (En Vivo)
2019: El Amor No Fue Pa' Mí (En Vivo)
2020: Que Sea
2020: Barquillero
2020: Volver A Volar
2020: Decepciones
2020: Te Volvería A Elegir
2020: Quiérete A Ti
2021: 100 Años (Con Calibre 50)
2021: El Mensaje
2021: Vamos Bien (En Vivo)
2021: Olvidarte, ¿Cómo? (En Vivo)
2021: Chito (En Vivo)
2021: El Triste Alegre (En Vivo)
2021: Hoy Empieza Mi Tristeza (En Vivo)
2021: A La Antigüita (En Vivo)
2021: Te Quiero Tanto, Tanto (En Vivo)
2021: Ni Mandándote A Hacer (En Vivo)
2021: Tú Eres Mi Amor (Versión Regional Mexicana)
2021: En Vivo Desde Rancho San Vicente
2021: Les Salió Travieso El Niño (En Vivo)
2021: Crónicas de la Batalla
2021: Cuidando El Territorio
2021: Qué Bonito
2022: Miranos Ahora
2022: El Mexicano Es Cabrón
2022: El Callado
2022: El Canelo
2022: Chalito (Versión Norteño)
2022: Así Que Te Vas
2023: El M Grande
2023: Dirección Equivocada

Awards and nominations

References

Mexican musical groups
Mexican norteño musical groups
Musical groups established in 2010
Mazatlán
2010 establishments in Mexico
Universal Music Latin Entertainment artists
Musical groups from Sinaloa